The Tajikistan Ambassador in Washington, D. C. is the official representative of the Government of the Republic of Tajikistan to the Government of the United States.

List of representatives

See also
Tajikistan–United States relations

References

United States
Tajikistan
Ambassadors